Gordon England may refer to:

 Gordon R. England (born 1937), American industrialist and government official
 Eric Gordon England (1891–1976), British pioneer aviator
 Gordon England (coachbuilder), a British coachbuilding company

England, Gordon